Govinda Rajula Gutta is a historical place in Warangal, Telangana, India. It is a holy place for Hindus in India.
As per its history Lord Srinivasa at Thirupati was tired of granting wishes to his devotees and came to rest unseen in the cave.  
He appeared in the dream of Rudrama Devi and revealed his presence on the hillock.  Rudrama Devi had sent her men and 
they discovered the main idol of Shri Govindaraja Swamy and also of Lord Krishna. 
A temple was built then on the hillock where swayambu resides between two huge rocks with sleeping and watching posture.
All the Vishnu festivals were grandly celebrated at this temple then onwards. 

Hindu temples in Hanamkonda district
Tourist attractions in Warangal
Vishnu temples